The Unknown Man of San Marino (Italian: Lo Sconosciuto di San Marino) is a 1946 Italian drama film directed by Michał Waszyński and starring Anna Magnani, Vittorio De Sica and Antonio Gandusio.

It was shot at the Icet Studios in Milan and on location around the Republic of San Marino where it is set. The screenwriter Cesare Zavattini and the actors Anna Magnani and Vittorio De Sica were key figures in the neorealist movement which was at its height when the film was made.

Synopsis
During the closing stages of the Second World War, refugees pour into San Marino. One of them is a foreigner who has apparently lost his memory. Liana, a prostitute, is very sympathetic towards him. He also bonds with members of the Polish Army he encounters. However, during a religious procession to mark the fall of the German Gothic Line, he is jolted by the memory of an atrocity he committed while serving with German forces against a similar procession. Filled with remorse, he commits suicide by walking into a minefield.

Cast
Anna Magnani as Liana, la prostituta 
Vittorio De Sica as Leo, l'ateo 
Aurel Milloss as Lo sconosciuto 
Antonio Gandusio as Don Antonio, il prete
Renata Bogdanska as Wanda 
Irma Gramatica as Agata
Franca Belli as Beatrice
Giuseppe Porelli  as Filippo, l'autista
Fausto Guerzoni as Marino
 Aristide Garbini as il cerimoniere
 Enrico Maria Salerno as MP Wolf

References

Bibliography
 Chiti, Roberto & Poppi, Roberto. Dizionario del cinema italiano: Dal 1945 al 1959. Gremese Editore, 1991.
 Sieglohr, Ulrike. Heroines Without Heroes: Reconstructing Female and National Identities in European Cinema, 1945-51. Bloomsbury Publishing, 2016.

External links 
 

1946 films
1940s Italian-language films
Italian black-and-white films
Films directed by Michał Waszyński
1946 drama films
Italian drama films
Films scored by Alessandro Cicognini
1940s Italian films